Scopula cassiaria is a moth of the family Geometridae first described by Charles Swinhoe in 1904. It is found in Kenya and Uganda.

References

Moths described in 1904
cassiaria
Moths of Africa